The Central Siberian Plateau is a vast mountainous area in Siberia, one of the Great Russian Regions.

Geography
The plateau occupies a great part of central Siberia between the Yenisei and Lena rivers. To the south it is bound by the Altai Mountains, Salair Ridge, Kuznetsk Alatau, the Eastern and Western Sayan Mountains and other mountains of Tuva, as well as the North Baikal Highlands and Baikal Mountains. To the north of the plateau lie the North Siberian Lowland and to the east the plateau gives way to the Central Yakutian Lowland and the Lena Plateau.

The surface of the Central Siberian Plateau is characterized by the alternation of wide plateaus and ridges, some of the latter sharply jagged. The Central Siberian Plateau covers one-third of Siberia.

Subplateaus and subranges
The system of the Central Siberian Plateau comprises a number of smaller plateaus and subranges, including, among others, the following:

Putorana Plateau, the northwesternmost, highest point Mount Kamen (highest of the plateau system) 
Anabar Plateau at the northern end, highest point 
Vilyuy Plateau, highest point 
Syverma Plateau, highest point Nakson, 
Tunguska Plateau, highest point 
Lena Plateau, highest point 
Lena-Angara Plateau, highest point Namai, 
Yenisei Range, highest point 
Angara Range, highest point

Climate
The climate is continental with short warm summers and long and severely cold winters. Most of the territory is covered with conifer forests (larch is especially abundant).  The plateau's major river is the Lower Tunguska. Known geologically as the Siberian Traps, mineral resources here are very rich and include coal, iron ore, gold, platinum, diamonds and  natural gas.

See also

Economy of Russia — Natural resources
South Siberian Mountains
Tunguska event
Udachnaya pipe

References

External links 

The Demise of the Siberian Plume
№1 Travel Guide